Dading is a 2014 Philippine television drama series broadcast by GMA Network. It premiered on the network's Afternoon Prime line up from June 23, 2014 to October 10, 2014, replacing Innamorata.

Mega Manila ratings are provided by AGB Nielsen Philippines.

Series overview

Episodes

June 2014

July 2014

August 2014

September 2014

October 2014

Episodes notes

References

Lists of Philippine drama television series episodes